Gary Allan Anderson (born September 22, 1955) is a retired American football guard in the National Football League for the Detroit Lions, the Washington Redskins and the New Orleans Saints.  He played college football at Stanford University and was drafted in the tenth round of the 1977 NFL Draft.

References

1955 births
Living people
American football offensive guards
Detroit Lions players
New Orleans Saints players
Stanford Cardinal football players
Washington Redskins players
People from Fairfield, California
Sportspeople from the San Francisco Bay Area
Players of American football from California